Jirah Momoisea (born 2 September 1998) is a New Zealand professional rugby league footballer who plays as a  and  forward for the Parramatta Eels in the NRL.

Background
Momoisea was born in Auckland, New Zealand. He played his junior rugby league for St Paul's College, before being signed by the Melbourne Storm.

Playing career

Early years
In 2017, Momoisea played for the Melbourne Storm NYC team. In 2018, he joined the Newcastle Knights and played for their Jersey Flegg Cup side. In 2019, he graduated to their Intrust Super Premiership team. In July 2019, he was upgraded to an NRL development contract with the Knights until the end of 2020. In January 2020, his contract was upgraded to the NRL top 30 squad and extended until the end of 2022. In December 2020, prior to the Christmas break, Momoisea ruptured his achilles tendon and had surgery to repair the injury, which would sideline him for the start of 2021.

2021
Momoisea made his return from injury with the Knights' Knock-On Effect NSW Cup side in May, before the competition was postponed in June and subsequently cancelled due to a breakout of the COVID-19 virus in New South Wales. However he travelled with the Knights' NRL squad to Queensland as the competition relocated to avoid the virus. In round 23 of the 2021 NRL season, he made his NRL debut for the Knights in their 22-16 win over the Canterbury-Bankstown Bulldogs.

2022
In June, Momoisea signed a two-year contract with the Parramatta Eels starting in 2023.

2023
He made his club debut for Parramatta in round 1 of the 2023 NRL season against Melbourne. Parramatta would lose 16-12 in golden point extra-time.

References

External links
Newcastle Knights profile

1998 births
Living people
New Zealand sportspeople of Samoan descent
New Zealand people of Tokelauan descent
New Zealand rugby league players
Newcastle Knights players
Parramatta Eels players
Rugby league players from Auckland
Rugby league props
Rugby league second-rows
People educated at St Paul's College, Auckland